Primordial Radio is a British premium online radio platform specialising in rock and metal music. The station was founded in January 2017 by Hugh Evans (Moose), Russ Collington (Dewsbury), Peter 'Pete' Bailey and Benjamin 'Mark' Woodhouse, all formerly of Team Rock. Through the loyalty of their fan base, the company hit its first major milestone in July 2017, successfully crowd equity funding £153,282 from 853 individual investors.  Test streams of the radio station began in May 2017 and the station officially launched on Saturday 30 September 2017 at 7pm.

Foundational Years
A predecessor in the same market was Team Rock, a company based in London and High Blantyre, South Lanarkshire, which published music magazines and operated an online radio station. Team Rock was placed in administration on 19 December 2016, with all employees made redundant and the radio station taken offline. This presented to Hugh Evans (Moose) an opportunity to create a station that would bring the rock music community together and ultimately be controlled by that community. Evans brought Russ Collington (Dewsbury), Peter 'Pete' Bailey and Benjamin 'Mark' Woodhouse on board to start building a new business.

In order to enable the community to have a controlling stake and sense of ownership in the business, the founders proposed the sale of an initial 13.27% share in the business through the equity funding company Seedrs. The target fund required for this share was £130,012. On 5 July 2017, the fund hit its target. On 15 July, the fund closed with £153,282 raised from 853 individual investors.

Primordial Radio went live on Saturday 30 September 2017, after a period of test streams. Since that date the station's presented content is subscription-only, at a price of £5.99 per month or £60 annually, with an initial month's free trial.

Alongside the radio ventures, the company runs events, sells merchandise and has its own beer, brewed in conjunction with Pig and Porter Brewery. The beer, Primordial Süp, was launched on 18 July 2017 in London at The Lexington. An established event is The Primordial Radio Pub quiz, where online teams around the world play a live pub quiz through an interactive stream.

On 11 January 2018, it was announced the first Annual General Meeting of FT Industries Ltd, holding company of Primordial Radio, would be held in Lincoln at the Lincolnshire Show Ground on Saturday 21 April 2018. The official post-AGM event #Drinkininlincoln took place in the evening, featuring live performances from Big Boy Bloater and the Limits, Massive Wagons and The Virginmarys.

On 20 August 2018, in a world first, Moose broadcast his breakfast show from an altitude of 35,000 ft on flight WS22 from Vancouver International Airport, Canada to Gatwick Airport, United Kingdom.  Moose was able to successfully broadcast the show using only his iPhone 6, a microphone and the WiFi facilities aboard the WestJet Boeing 767 flight. This was built on his previous success broadcasting a show whilst travelling across London using the London Underground transport system as part of the Moose and JRock breakfast show on Team Rock Radio in 2015.

In a UK first for a radio station, Primordial Radio announced on 6 September 2018 they had secured a deal with Vodafone to have unlimited data usage through their official app with the Vodafone Music Pass.

On 6 October 2018, Massive Wagons and Evil Scarecrow were announced by Primordial Radio as the headliners of the Primordial Radio Annual General Mayhem, which takes place on Saturday 27 April 2019 after the company's second AGM. Skarlett Riot were next to be announced to play the Annual General Mayhem, quickly followed by Millie Manders and The Shut Up.

After previously announcing at the First AGM event Primordial Radio had a tartan design registered, Primordial Radio launched The Pride of Primordial on 24 January 2019. To mark the occasion, Primordial Radio hosted a Burns Supper in Edinburgh on 25 January 2019.

Rebranding 

The Covid-19 pandemic slowed the ability for the business to operate their planned 2020 Long Road to Brewing Tour and Annual General Mayhem Events. The long awaited Annual General Mayhem 2020 would go on to be announced for the 18th September 2021.

On the 25th August 2021, a new website and branding material were launched during the video version of the Primordial Radio Podcast Episode 232.

In 2021, two key partnerships were announced, firstly with Surprise You're Dead Music, as the on going tour booker for Primordial Radio. Their second partnership was announced with See Tickets, bring them onboard as their official ticket partner. Both of these partnerships culminated in the first announcement of the newly named Primordial General Mayhem '22 for 22–23 April 2022, with Friday and Saturday headliners Those Damn Crows and Dinosaur Pile-up respectively. Included on the bill are: As December Falls, Bob Vylan, Millie Manders and the Shutup, Seething Akira, Skarlett Riot and Ward XVI.

In 2022 due to notable year on year losses the company has had to go back on what it said it would never do and introduce commercial advertising to the live streams

Future plans 
The company wishes to push the boundaries of radio broadcasting by developing the ability for the listener to choose their own music in and around the presenter's content. By tracking listener's habits and preferences, they will be able to have presented radio, whilst listening to their own unique radio stream. The service offers music streaming akin to Spotify and the ability to choose like Tinder; all with presenter interactions of a radio station. Alongside this functionality, the station will continue to have a linear based radio station, where the DJ's have control of the music.

References

External links 

Radio stations in London
Radio stations established in 2017
Internet radio stations in the United Kingdom
Rock radio stations in the United Kingdom